Howard C. Badger (1914-1989) was a member of the Utah House of Representatives from 1942 to 1944. He also served as president of the South African Mission of The Church of Jesus Christ of Latter-day Saints.

Badger was a real estate developer. He was involved with developments in Bountiful, Utah.

As a young man in the mid-1930s Badger served a mission for the Church in South Africa.

In 1939 he married Eleanor Jeremy Ashton, daughter of prominent leader in The Church of Jesus Christ of Latter-day Saints Marvin O. Ashton and sister of future apostle Marvin J. Ashton. Together they became the parents of five children.

He was president of the South African mission from 1967 to 1970. He also was a regional representative of the 12.

Bibliography
1989 Deseret News obituary

References

1915 births
Members of the Utah House of Representatives
Latter Day Saints from Utah
American Mormon missionaries in South Africa
1989 deaths
20th-century American politicians